Jensia rammii is a species of flowering plant in the family Asteraceae known by the common name Ramm's madia. It is endemic to California, where it is limited to the northern slopes of the Sierra Nevada and its foothills.

Jensia rammii is an annual herb with a hairy, glandular, branching stem up to 60 centimeters (2 feet) tall. The inflorescence produces flower heads on long peduncles. The head has 5-12 yellow ray florets up to a centimeter (0.4 inches) long with lobed tips. The 16–65 yellow disc florets at the center have black anthers. The fruit is an achene a few millimeters long.

References

External links
Jepson Manual Treatment, University of California
United States Department of Agriculture Plants Profile
Calphotos Photo gallery, University of California

Madieae
Plants described in 1885
Endemic flora of California
Flora without expected TNC conservation status